Ozarkodina is an extinct genus of conodonts in the family Spathognathodontidae.

Use in stratigraphy 
Ozarkodina snajdri forms a subdivision of the Pseudomonoclimacis latilobus graptolite zone in the Burgsvik beds Silurian formation in Sweden. An Ozarkodina snajdri crispa zone has also been identified in the Wills Creek in Virginia.

Ozarkodina derenjalensis is found in the Silurian of the Niur Formation in Iran.

The Kellwasser event in the Devonian which saw the extinction of all Ozarkodina species is reported in the list of Global Boundary Stratotype Sections and Points.

References

External links 

 Ozarkodina at fossilworks.org (retrieved 30 April 2016)

Ozarkodinida genera
Devonian conodonts
Devonian extinctions
Paleozoic life of Ontario
Paleozoic life of the Northwest Territories
Paleozoic life of Nunavut
Paleozoic life of Quebec
Paleozoic life of Yukon